Giovanni Battista Tagliasacchi (26 August 1697 – 3 December 1737) was an Italian painter of the late-Baroque period.

Tagliasacchi was born at Borgo San Donnino.  For some time he painted historical scenes in the manner of his teacher Giovanni Gioseffo dal Sole. He was also an excellent portrait painter. He was mainly active in Piacenza. Some of his works were painted for San Pietro, Piacenza.

References
  He died in Castelbosco.

People from Piacenza
17th-century Italian painters
Italian male painters
18th-century Italian painters
Italian Baroque painters
Painters from Bologna
1697 births
1737 deaths
18th-century Italian male artists